Kamalpur is a village in Rupnagar district in the Indian state of Punjab.

References

Villages in Rupnagar district